Sunshine Orchestra is a project by the AR Rahman Foundation aiming to put an Indian symphony orchestra on the world map. It provides free musical training for socially and economically deprived children with an aptitude in music through the KM Music Conservatory. Srinivasa Murthy is the mentor and conductor for the orchestra. The first class of the Sunshine Orchestra began in 2009.

The Sunshine Orchestra has played for many events and films. The Sunshine Orchestra also plays for AR Rahman's live concerts.

Discography 

 Beyond the Clouds (2017 film)
 O Kadhal Kanmani
 Mom(film)
 Mersal (film)
 Sachin: A Billion Dreams
 Sarkar (2018 film)
 Lingaa

References

External links
Instagram

Indian musical groups
Symphony orchestras
Youth orchestras
Music education in India